Ranon may refer to:
 Ranón, one of five parishes in Soto del Barco, a municipality in Asturias, in northern Spain
 Rånön, an island in the northwest of the Swedish sector of the Bay of Bothnia, in the Kalix archipelago